Mahishadal Raj College, established in 1946, is the second oldest college in Purba Medinipur district. It offers undergraduate courses in arts, commerce and sciences. It is affiliated to Vidyasagar University.

History
Mahishadal Raj College is the third oldest college in the undivided district of Midnapore and fiftieth one under University of Calcutta. The college was founded on 1st August, 1946 by Kumar Debaprasad Garga Bahadur, the then “Raja” of Mahishadal and a celebrity in the field of music and fine arts. Now the College is affiliated to Vidyasagar University since 01.06.1985, vide letter no. 983-Edn (U) dt. 23.05.1985.. It was originally affiliated with University of Calcutta, until its affiliation was changed to Vidyasagar University in 1985.

Departments

Science

Chemistry
Computer Science
Physics
Mathematics
Botany
Geology
Zoology
Nutrition
Physiology

Arts and Commerce

Bengali
English
Sanskrit
History
Geography
Political Science
Philosophy
Education
Music
Economics
Sociology
Commerce
accountancy

Accreditation
In 2016 Mahishadal Raj College has been awarded A grade by the National Assessment and Accreditation Council (NAAC). The college is also recognized by the University Grants Commission (UGC).

See also

References

External links
Mahishadal Raj College
Vidyasagar University
University Grants Commission
National Assessment and Accreditation Council

Colleges affiliated to Vidyasagar University
Educational institutions established in 1946
Universities and colleges in Purba Medinipur district
1946 establishments in India